These are the official results of the Women's javelin throw event (old design) at the 1982 European Championships in Athens, Greece, held at Olympic Stadium "Spiros Louis" on 8 and 9 September 1982. All results were made with a rough surfaced javelin (old design).

Medalists

Abbreviations
All results shown are in metres

Results

Final
9 September

Qualification
8 September

Participation
According to an unofficial count, 20 athletes from 13 countries participated in the event.

 (1)
 (3)
 (3)
 (2)
 (1)
 (1)
 (1)
 (2)
 (1)
 (1)
 (1)
 (1)
 (2)

See also
 1980 Women's Olympic Javelin Throw (Moscow)
 1983 Women's World Championships Javelin Throw (Helsinki)
 1984 Women's Olympic Javelin Throw (Los Angeles)
 1987 Women's World Championships Javelin Throw (Rome)
 1988 Women's Olympic Javelin Throw (Seoul)

References

 Results
 todor66

Javelin throw
Javelin throw at the European Athletics Championships
1982 in women's athletics